The 1996–97 Indiana Hoosiers men's basketball team represented Indiana University. Their head coach was Bobby Knight, who was in his 26th year. The team played its home games in Assembly Hall in Bloomington, Indiana, and was a member of the Big Ten Conference. The Hoosiers finished the regular season with an overall record of 22–11 and a conference record of 9–9, finishing in a tie for sixth in the Big Ten. The Hoosiers received an at-large bid to the NCAA tournament as a No. 8 seed. However, IU made a quick exit with a loss in the First Round to Colorado.

Roster

Schedule and results

|-
!colspan=8 style=| Non-conference regular season

|-
!colspan=9 style=|Big Ten regular season

|-
!colspan=9 style=|NCAA tournament

Rankings

References

Indiana Hoosiers men's basketball seasons
Indiana
Indiana
1996 in sports in Indiana
1997 in sports in Indiana